Changing Faces is an American female R&B duo that was initially active between the years 1994 until their hiatus in 2000.

Career

Early days
Lucas and Rose were backing vocalists for Sybil for two years before they formed Changing Faces. The pair returned to New York, where they worked at a dermatologist's office in Manhattan during the day while recording demos at night with producer Dinky Bingham. A local record producer heard the duo singing on the street and signed them to Big Beat Records, a subsidiary of Atlantic.

Changing Faces' first two singles—"Stroke You Up" and "Foolin' Around"—were written and produced by R. Kelly. The two singles reached the R&B Top Ten in late 1994, with "Stroke You Up" peaking at number three on the Billboard Hot 100 charts. Changing Faces's eponymous debut was released in 1994 and went gold on the strength of the two hits. Following the success of their debut, they participated in the “Freedom” single for the ‘’Panther’’ film as well as released soundtrack singles “We Got It Goin’ On” (‘’White Man’s Burden’’) and “I’ve Got Somebody Else’ (‘’High School High’’).

All Day, All Night and Jodeci's Mentorship
Changing Faces returned in 1997 with their second album, All Day, All Night. Kelly produced "G.H.E.T.T.O.U.T.," the first single from the album and their biggest R&B hit to date, reaching number one on the R&B chart, and number eight on the Billboard Hot 100. The second single from the album, "All of My Days", also appeared on the soundtrack to Space Jam.

In 1998, the group participated in the soundtrack of the Eddie Murphy movie Dr. Dolittle with the song "Do Little Things" featuring Ivan Matias. They also released the single “Same Tempo” for the ‘’Player’s Club’’ that same year.

Visit Me and breakup
Their third record breaking album Visit Me was released in Autumn 2000. The album’s first single "That Other Woman" received worldwide success on the R&B charts and became a hit on the Billboard Dance Club Play chart peaking at number five. Their third Single "Just Us" received slim chances of little promotion leading to lawsuits against the record labels for ownership of their entire catalog's discography, masters of every note sung, and recorded throughout their first half of their contracts.

In 2006, Cassandra Lucas sang background vocals on "Special Girl" for Donell Jones' album Journey of a Gemini.

In August 2009, a new Changing Faces song was leaked online called "Crazy Luv". The song was rumored to be on their new album, but was not confirmed by Lucas or Rose to be their comeback single off their new album, which was rumored to be released sometime in 2012.

On September 18, 2011, during a special appearance at the RnB Spotlight Concert with Lil Mo' at BB King's Blues Club in NYC, Changing Faces member Lucas announced on Kempire Radio and on YouKnowIGotSoul.com that she and Rose were in the recording studio working on a new Changing Faces project that would be released in 2012, with a new single being released soon. She also stated that the group never broke up and was working with R. Kelly on new music.

On April 3, 2013, Changing Faces released a new single "Hate Love" via iTunes. A music video was filmed but was not released.

In 2014, Changing Faces was scheduled to perform at an Rhythm & Blues Superstars concert in the United Kingdom - however, Rose brought along Reefy Scott whom is also the new member of the group to tour and perform without telling Lucas. As a result, Lucas filed a lawsuit towards Rose - despite the duo mutually agreeing to halt any plans for a reunion.

Solo work
In September 2013, it was announced that Cassandra Lucas was working on a solo album in addition to forming a new label CRC Musik with her husband Noel “Chris” Absolam and business partner Richard Smith. Her debut solo single, "Damn" was released on September 3, 2013. She released subsequent singles "Music & a Beat" in July 2017 as well as "Give Love a Chance" and "I Love You" later that year.

Lucas’ first single "Name on It" premiered in January 2018 and became a hit on the Urban AC chart. Her second single "Take Me Home (Remix)" featuring Ron Browz and HoodCelebrityy will receive major  promotion with the music video scheduled to film throughout the historical African American Day Parade in Lucas's Hometown of Harlem.

In April 2019, Cassandra Lucas released her debut solo album Long Way Home... The Intro.

Charisse Rose performed at a 1990s World Pride Concert in June 2019 with predicate Reefy Scott as the new member of the Legendary duo.

Discography

Studio albums

Singles

Featured singles

References

External links

   La biographie SoulRnB.com consacrée à Changing Faces

American contemporary R&B musical groups
African-American musical groups
American girl groups
Musical groups from New York (state)
Atlantic Records artists
Contemporary R&B duos
Ballad music groups
American musical duos
Female musical duos